Ilona Verley is a Canadian-American drag queen, most known for competing on the first season of Canada's Drag Race.

Early life
Verley was raised in Lytton, British Columbia  and Surrey, British Columbia. They attended the Blanche MacDonald Centre in Vancouver for make-up artistry.

Career
Verley appeared in pop singer Mathew V's 2018 video for his single "Broken", after Mathew V attended a drag show at which Verley had performed to Mathew V's 2017 single "Tell Me Smooth".

Verley competed on the first season of Canada's Drag Race, a reality competition television series based on the American series RuPaul's Drag Race and the Canadian edition of the Drag Race franchise. Prior to their appearance on the show, they had auditioned in Los Angeles for the eleventh and twelfth seasons of American version. They became the "first Indigenous, two-spirit, and openly non-binary queen" to compete. On Canada's Drag Race, Verley placed in the bottom two on three occasions and was eliminated in the seventh episode. They also attracted positive notice for their look in the season finale, which blended a First Nations jingle dress in their signature pastel colours with red handprints, a symbol of the issue of missing and murdered Indigenous women.

They have also worked at a NYX Professional Makeup store.

In October 2020, Verley was announced as one of the performers at the opening gala of the 2020 imagineNATIVE Film and Media Arts Festival.

In November 2020, Verley was named to Out magazine's annual Out100 list of influential LGBTQ personalities.

Personal life
Verley is Nlaka'pamux and two-spirit, and has said they identify as a "proud, Indigenous trans woman". They have described their gender identity as fluid and in flux. In November 2020 they stated: "I don't want to put my foot down too much with any label. Because who knows, in a few months from now, when I'm in a better mind-set or a better situation, how I'm going to feel". On the LGBTQ&A podcast in the same month, Verley said "I think for me right now, the best way to describe who I am right now in this moment is nonbinary and gender fluid."

They live in Vancouver as of October 2020, having returned to Canada after living in Los Angeles. In 2020, they accused NYX Professional Makeup of cultural insensitivity.

Filmography

Television
 Canada's Drag Race (season 1)

References

External links

 
 

1990s births
Living people
21st-century Canadian artists
Artists from Vancouver
Canada's Drag Race contestants
Canadian drag queens
Canadian make-up artists
Nlaka'pamux people
Non-binary drag performers
People from Surrey, British Columbia
Transgender entertainers
Two-spirit people
First Nations artists
Genderfluid people
21st-century Canadian LGBT people